Professor John Russell Hinnells (27 August 1941 - 3 May 2018) was Professor of Comparative Religion at the School of Oriental and African Studies of the University of London. At various times he held the posts of lecturer at Newcastle University, then Professor of Comparative Religion at Manchester University, and later at University of Derby and Liverpool Hope University, and was a fellow at Robinson College, Cambridge.

After school, he spent some time at Mirfield as part of the Community of the Resurrection, where he was influenced by the work of Trevor Huddleston. He then went to King's College London, tutored by Christopher Evans and Morna Hooker, and with Desmond Tutu as a tutorial partner. Later he would undertake Postgraduate work at the School of Oriental and African Studies, with Sir Harold Bailey and Mary Boyce.

From 1967 he shaped his subject in several ways over a period of five decades:

 He played a key role in the Shap Working Party, shaping the way religion has been taught in schools for the last fifty years. In 1970 he edited Comparative Religion in Education, with a foreword by the then Secretary of State for Education, Edward Short.
He popularised the subject of comparative religion through books with a wide readership, including the first Penguin Dictionary of Religions, the Handbook of Living Religions, the Handbook of Ancient Religions  and the Who's Who of World Religions.
 He deepened the research base through books on research method that geographers and sociologists also use, most notably through The Routledge Companion to the Study of Religion,  and the series on Textual Sources for the Study of Religion, which applied biblical criticism techniques to other religious works.
 He widened the thematic study of religion through books on religious diaspora, religion and violence, religion health and suffering, and religion wealth and giving.
 He was an authority on Zoroastrianism. His books on Zoroastrianism include Persian Mythology, Zoroastrians in Britain, and The Zoroastrian Diaspora: religion and Migration.
In total he is believed to have published at least 98 works in 655 editions in 7 languages.

A festschrift was published in his honour in 2017, building on his thematic study of religions to explore religion and material wealth. His work was memorialised in The Times  and The Daily Telegraph, and by a memorial lecture by Almut Hintze at SOAS, His book collection is now at the Ancient India and Iran Trust in Cambridge, and is being catalogued as the John Hinnells Collection and made available through the Cambridge University Library.

References

1941 births
2018 deaths
Academics of the University of Derby
Academics of Liverpool Hope University
Academics of SOAS University of London
Academics of the University of Manchester
Fellows of Robinson College, Cambridge
Zoroastrian studies scholars
20th-century translators